From 1 May 2018 onwards Ministry of Finance of Government of India started releasing monthly GST revenue collection data via official press release through Press Information Bureau. And to further improve transparency Government of India started issuing state-wise monthly collection data from 1 January 2020.

Revenue Collections

Monthly National Revenue Collections

Official Source

State-Wise Monthly Revenue Collections

States
Note: Below tables does not include GST on import of goods

Andhra Pradesh

Arunachal Pradesh

Assam

Bihar

Chhattisgarh

Goa

Gujarat

Haryana

Himachal Pradesh

Jharkhand

Karnataka

Kerala

Madhya Pradesh

Maharashtra

Manipur

Meghalaya

Mizoram

Nagaland

Odisha

Punjab

Rajasthan

Sikkim

Tamil Nadu

Telangana

Tripura

Uttar Pradesh

Uttarakhand

West Bengal

Union Territories
Note: Below tables does not include GST on import of goods

Andaman and Nicobar Islands

Chandigarh

Dadra and Nagar Haveli and Daman and Diu

Jammu and Kashmir

Ladakh

Lakshadweep

National Capital Territory of Delhi

Puducherry

Other Territory
Note: Below table does not include GST on import of goods

Center Jurisdiction
Note: Below table does not include GST on import of goods

Monthly GST Revenue Collections from Import

Returns
Around 38 lakh new taxpayers have registered under GST regime and the total count has crossed one crore if we include the 64 lakh earlier ones. Total number of taxpayers were above 1.14 crore in October 2018.

GSTR1 Filling Data

GSTR3B Filling Data

Official Source

See also
 The Great Hedge of India, a historic colonial-era inland customs border
Goods and Services Tax (India)

Notes

References

External links 

Central Board of Indirect Taxes and Customs
Goods and Services Tax Council
e-Way Bill System at ewaybill.nic.in. National Informatics Centre.

Taxation in India
India
Economic history of India (1947–present)